Four general speed limits apply on roads in Serbia:

  within inhabited places.
  outside inhabited places.
  on expressways (Put rezervisan za saobraćaj motornih vozila).
  on motorways (Autoput).

The limits shown above apply only if there are no other signs present, as the signs may prescribe a lower or a higher speed limit (limits of 80 km/h or higher can also be found within inhabited places).

Speed limit by vehicle type:
  for vehicles towing caravans or trailers.

References

1. Conformed
2. 

Serbia
Transport in Serbia